Mawai may refer to:

Mawai, Jalandhar, a village in Phillaur in Jalandhar district of Punjab State, India
Mawai, Raebareli, a village in Uttar Pradesh, India
Mawae or Mawai, a dialect of the Zia language of Morobe Province, Papua New Guinea
Mavia (queen), also transliterated Mawai, an Arab warrior queen 375–425 CE
, a Hong Kong coaster formerly named Empire Mayrose